Maurice of Orange (14 November 1567 – 23 April 1625) was stadtholder of all the provinces of the Dutch Republic except for Friesland from 1585 at the earliest until his death in 1625. Before he became Prince of Orange upon the death of his eldest half-brother Philip William in 1618, he was known as Maurice of Nassau.

Maurice spent his youth in Dillenburg in Nassau, and studied in Heidelberg and Leiden. He succeeded his father William the Silent as stadtholder of Holland and Zeeland in 1585, and became stadtholder of Utrecht, Guelders and Overijssel in 1590, and of Groningen in 1620. As Captain-General and Admiral of the Union, Maurice organized the Dutch rebellion against Spain into a coherent, successful revolt and won fame as a military strategist. Under his leadership and in cooperation with the Land's Advocate of Holland Johan van Oldenbarnevelt, the Dutch States Army achieved many victories and drove the Spaniards out of the north and east of the Republic. Maurice set out to revive and revise the classical doctrines of Vegetius and pioneered the new European forms of armament and drill. During the Twelve Years' Truce, a religious dispute broke out in the Republic, and a conflict erupted between Maurice and Van Oldenbarnevelt, which ended with the latter's decapitation. After the Truce, Maurice failed to achieve more military victories. He died without legitimate children in The Hague in 1625 and was succeeded by his younger half-brother Frederick Henry.

Life

Maurice was the son of William the Silent and Anna of Saxony and was born at the castle of Dillenburg. He was named after his maternal grandfather, the Elector Maurice of Saxony, who was also a noted general.

Maurice never married but was the father of illegitimate children by Margaretha van Mechelen (including Willem of Nassau, Lord of the Lek, and Louis of Nassau, Lord of De Lek and Beverweerd) and Anna van de Kelder. He was raised in Dillenburg by his uncle Johan of Nassau ("Jan the Old").
Together with his cousin, Willem Lodewijk, he studied in Heidelberg and later in Leiden where he met Simon Stevin. The States of Holland and Zeeland paid for his studies, as their father had run into financial problems after spending his entire fortune in the early stages of the Dutch revolt.

Only 16 when his father was murdered in Delft in 1584, he soon was appointed to his father's office of stadtholder (Stadhouder). The monarchs of England and France had been requested to accept sovereignty but had refused. This had left Maurice as the only acceptable candidate for the position of Stadtholder. He became stadtholder of Holland and Zeeland in 1585, of Guelders, Overijssel and Utrecht in 1590 and of Groningen and Drenthe in 1620 (following the death of Willem Lodewijk, who had been stadtholder there and in Friesland).

Protestant Maurice was preceded as Prince of Orange (not a Dutch title) by his Roman Catholic eldest half-brother Philip William, Prince of Orange, deceased 1618. However, Philip William was in the custody of Spain, remaining so until 1596, and was thus unable to lead the Dutch independence cause.

Maria of Nassau (1556–1616) was a full sister of Philip William from the first marriage of William I, Prince of Orange, (assassinated 1584), to wealthy and powerful aristocrat Anna van Egmont (1533–1558), and a contender to Maurice over the estate of their father.

He was appointed captain-general of the army in 1587, bypassing the Earl of Leicester, who returned to England on hearing this news.

Military career

Maurice organized the rebellion against Spain into a coherent, successful revolt. He reorganized the Dutch States Army together with Willem Lodewijk, studied military history, strategy and tactics, mathematics and astronomy, and proved himself to be among the best strategists of his age. The Eighty Years' War was a challenge to his style, so he could prove himself a good leader by taking several Spanish outposts. Paying special attention to the siege theories of Simon Stevin, he took valuable key fortresses and towns during a period known as the Ten Glory Years: Breda in 1590, Zutphen, Knodsenburg in 1591, Steenwijk and Coevorden in 1592, Geertruidenberg in 1593, and Groningen in 1594. In 1597 he went on a further offensive and took Rheinberg, Meurs, Groenlo, Bredevoort, Enschede, Ootmarsum, and Oldenzaal and closed off the year with the capture of Lingen. These victories rounded out the borders to the Dutch Republic, solidifying the revolt and allowing a national state to develop behind secure borders. They also established Maurice as the foremost general of his time. Many of the great generals of the succeeding generation, including his brother Frederick Henry and many of the commanders of the English Civil War, learned their trade under his command.

For a series of maps showing Maurice's campaigns to extend and consolidate the borders of the Republic, see Gallery of Maps of the 80 Years War (in Dutch).

His victories in the pitched battles at Turnhout (1597) and at Nieuwpoort (1600) were dependent on his innovation of cooperation between arms, with his cavalry playing a major role. The victories earned him military fame and acknowledgement throughout Europe. Despite these successes, the House of Orange did not attain great respect among European royalty, as the Stadtholdership was not inheritable.

The training of his army was especially important to early modern warfare and the Military Revolution of 1560–1650. Previous generals had made use of drill and exercise in order to instill discipline or to keep the men physically fit, but for Maurice, they "were the fundamental postulates of tactics." 

This change affected the entire conduct of warfare, since it required the officers to train men in addition to leading them, decreased the size of the basic infantry unit for functional purposes since more specific orders had to be given in battle, and the decrease in herd behavior required more initiative and intelligence from the average soldier. One major contribution was the introduction of volley fire, which enabled soldiers to compensate for the inaccuracy of their weapons by firing in a large group. It was first used in European combat at the battle of Nieuwpoort in 1600.

As part of his efforts to find allies against Spain, Maurice received Moroccan envoys such as Al-Hajari. They discussed the possibility of an alliance between Holland, the Ottoman Empire, Morocco and the Moriscos, against the common enemy Spain. Al-Hajari's journey chronicles, authored in 1637, mentions in detail the discussion for a combined offensive against Spain.

Maurice was known in his time and by historians as the first general of his age. His reputation rests not as much on his ability to win and exploit field battles as it does on his expertise as a siege commander, military organizer, and innovator. Of his two great adversaries, Alexander Farnese, Duke of Parma, and Ambrogio Spinola, he cautiously never allowed himself to be brought to battle with Parma and did not follow up chances to offer Spinola battle with forces in his favour on the Yssel in 1606. He was, however, dealt a defeat by the Spanish general at the battle of Mülheim in October 1605. Based on his preference for sieges and small-scale actions, historian David Trim states that it is difficult to reach a verdict on his ability as a tactician. Jonathan Israel notes that on one of the rare occasions when he did have to fight a major battle in the open – the 1600 Battle of Nieuwpoort – it did end with a Dutch victory, but this outcome was highly risky, and Maurice took care to extricate his army and avoid a second such battle.

Maurice founded a whole new school of military professional practice. These pointed the way to the professional armies of the future by reapplying Roman tactics and innovating in the fields of logistics, training, and economics (e.g. paying troops regularly and on time). Many graduates of service under Maurice, such as his nephew, the Marshal Turenne, or his disciples such as Gustavus Adolphus of Sweden, applied the Mauritian reforms to great effect in the remainder of the 17th century.

Maurice and Oldenbarnevelt

Maurice started out as the protégé of Landsadvocaat (Land's Advocate, i.e. secretary to the nobility of Holland and legal counsel to the States of Holland, but functioning as de facto chief minister of Holland and the States-General) Johan van Oldenbarnevelt, but gradually tensions rose between these two men. Against Maurice's advice, and despite his protests, Van Oldenbarnevelt decided to sign the Twelve Years' Truce with Spain, which lasted from 1609 to 1621. The required funds to maintain the army and navy and the general course of the war were other topics of constant struggle.

With the religious troubles between Gomarists (strict Calvinists) and the Remonstrants (Arminians), the struggle between Van Oldenbarnevelt and Maurice reached a climax. Van Oldenbarnevelt was arrested, tried and decapitated despite numerous requests for mercy. Important municipal regents such as Jacob Dircksz de Graeff and Cornelis Hooft from Amsterdam were temporarily removed from office by Moritz' powerful supporter Reynier Pauw. From 1618 till his death Maurice now enjoyed uncontested power over the Republic. He expanded the Stadtholder's palace at the Binnenhof in the Hague. The Maurice Tower is now part of the building complex of the Senate of the Netherlands. In 1618, he also succeeded his elder half-brother Philip William as Prince of Orange, a title he seems rarely to have used.

Maurice urged his cadet half brother Frederick Henry to marry in order to preserve the dynasty.

Thirty Years' and Eighty Years' War

Historian Jonathan Israel places upon Maurice part of the responsibility for the outbreak of the Thirty Years' War in which Germany was devastated and a large part of its population killed. As noted by Israel, German Protestants were not eager for an all-out confrontation with the Catholics. Maurice significantly helped precipitate such a confrontation by persuading his nephew Frederick V, Elector Palatine, to accept the Bohemian Crown, as well as actively encouraging the Bohemians to confront Habsburg rule, providing them 50,000 guilders as well as sending Dutch troops to fight in the doomed Battle of the White Mountain. This ill-considered decision proved disastrous to the Bohemians, who were thereby plunged into prolonged oppression, and to Frederick who lost his ancestral lands. It also worsened the Dutch Republic's own strategic position.

In 1621 the war with Spain resumed after a 12-year period of truces. The Spanish, led by Ambrogio Spinola, had notable successes, including the Siege of Breda, the old Nassau family residence, in 1625.

Maurice died on 23 April 1625, with the siege still underway. Justin of Nassau surrendered Breda in June 1625 after a costly eleven-month siege.

List of battles

Maurice participated in these battles as principal commander of Dutch forces:

 Axel
 1st Bergen op Zoom, 1588
 Medemblik, 1588
 3rd Breda, 1590
 2nd Steenbergen, 1590
 3rd Zutphen, 1591
 2nd Deventer, 1591
 Delfzijl, 1591
 Knodsenburg, 1591
 Hulst, 1591
 Nijmegen, 1591
 Steenwijk, 1592
 1st Coevorden, 1592
 Gertrudenberg, 1593
 2nd Coevorden, 1593
 Groningen, 1594
 2nd Groenlo, 1595
 1st Hulst, 1596
 Turnhout, 1597
 2nd Venlo, 1597
 2nd Rheinberg, 1597
 1st Meurs, 1597
 3rd Groenlo, 1597
 1st Bredevoort, 1597
 Enschede, 1597
 Ootmarsum, 1597
 1st Oldenzaal, 1597
 1st Lingen, 1597
 2nd Meurs, 1598
 3rd Rheinberg, 1598
 Doetinchem
 Rees, 1599
 Zaltbommel (1599)
 San Andreas
 Nieuwpoort, 1600
 Ostend, 1601
 Siege of 's-Hertogenbosch (1601)
 Siege of Sluis (1604)
 2nd Oldenzaal, 1605
 2nd Lingen, 1605
 Mülheim, 1605
 Wachtendonk
 Krakau Castle
 2nd Bredevoort, 1606
 4th Rheinberg, 1606
 4th Groenlo, 1606
 3rd Venlo, 1606
 Jülich, 1621–22
 2nd Bergen op Zoom, 1622
 3rd Steenbergen, 1622
 4th Breda, 1624

Namesakes
 The island nation of Mauritius, located in the Indian Ocean, was named after him. The island was named in the prince's honour by Wybrant Warwijck in 1598 and Dutch emigrants first settled it in May 1638.
 In 1611, the Dutch variously named what is now known as the Hudson River the Mauritius River or the Mauritz River, in honour of the prince. It was also similarly referred to as the Nassau River.

Coat of arms and titles 

Maurice, besides being stadtholder of several provinces and Captain-General, both non-hereditary and appointive titles, was the hereditary sovereign of the principality of Orange in what is today Provence in France. He also was the lord of many other estates, which formed his wealth:
 Marquis of Veere and Vlissingen
 Count of Nassau-Dillenburg, Buren, Leerdam, Katzenelnbogen, and Vianden
 Viscount of Antwerp and Besançon
 Baron of Aggeris, Breda, Cranendonck, Lands of Cuijk, Daesburg, Eindhoven, City of Grave, Lek, IJsselstein, Diest, Grimbergen, Herstal, Warneton, Bentheim-Lingen, Moers, Arlay, and Nozeroy; Lord of Dasburg, Geertruidenberg, Hooge en Lage Zwaluwe, Klundert, Montfort, Naaldwijk, Niervaart, Polanen, Steenbergen, Sint-Maartensdijk, Willemstad, Bütgenbach, Sankt Vith, and Besançon.

During his lifetime he kept using the arms as during his father's life-time shown here, and never changed to the simpler arms used by his father and half brothers.

Descendants 
Maurice never married but was the father of several illegitimate children:

by Margaretha van Mechelen:
 Willem of Nassau, Lord of the Lek (1601–1627)
 Louis of Nassau, Lord of De Lek and Beverweerd (Lodewijk) (1604–1665)
 Maurice (Maurits) (1604–1617)

by Cornelia Jacobsdochter:
 Anna (?–1673)

by Ursula de Rijck:
 Elisabeth (1611–1679)
 Karl (Carel) (ca. 1612–1637)

by Anna van de Kelder:
 Karl (Carel) Maurice

by Deliana de Backer:
 Eleonora (?–1673)

See also
 Dutch Empire (begun during his reign, circa 1603–1605)
 Dutch Revolt

References

Further reading
 
 
 John Lothrop Motley, "History of the United Netherlands from the Death of William the Silent to the Synod of Dort".  London:  John Murray, 1860.
 John Lothrop Motley, "The Life and Death of John of Barenvelt". New York & London:  Harper and Brothers Publishing, 1900.
 Petrus Johannes Blok, "History of the people of the Netherlands". New York:  G. P. Putnam's sons, 1898.

External links

1567 births
Counts of Nassau
1625 deaths
People from Dillenburg
Dutch stadtholders
Dutch military commanders
Dutch people of the Eighty Years' War (United Provinces)
17th-century Dutch military personnel
17th-century Dutch politicians
House of Orange-Nassau
Princes of Orange
Lords of Breda
Knights of the Garter
Burials in the Royal Crypt at Nieuwe Kerk, Delft
Military strategists
People of the Anglo-Spanish War (1625–1630)